Meharry Medical College is a private historically black medical school affiliated with the United Methodist Church and located in Nashville, Tennessee. Founded in 1876 as the Medical Department of Central Tennessee College, it was the first medical school for African Americans in the South. This region had the highest proportion of this ethnicity, but they were excluded from many public and private segregated institutions of higher education, particularly after the end of Reconstruction.

Meharry Medical College was chartered separately in 1915. In the early 21st century, it has become the largest private historically black institution in the United States solely dedicated to educating health care professionals and scientists. The school has never been segregated.

Meharry Medical College includes its School of Medicine, School of Dentistry, a School of Allied Health Professions, School of Graduate Studies and Research, the Harold R. West Basic Sciences Center, and the Metropolitan General Hospital of Nashville-Davidson County. The degrees that Meharry offers include Doctor of Medicine (M.D.), Doctor of Dental Surgery (D.D.S.), Master of Science in Public Health (M.S.P.H.), Master of Health Science (M.H.S.), and Doctor of Philosophy (Ph.D.) degrees.  Meharry is the second-largest educator of African-American medical doctors and dentists in the United States. It has the highest percentage of African Americans graduating with Ph.Ds in the biomedical sciences in the country.

Journal of Health Care for the Poor and Underserved is a public health journal owned by and edited at Meharry Medical College. Around 76% of graduates of the school work as doctors treating people in underserved communities. School training emphasizes recognizing health disparities in different populations.

History

Meharry Medical College was one of six medical institutions established between the years of 1876 and 1900 in the state of Tennessee. These schools were founded after the end of the Civil War when slaves had been freed and there were as yet few African-American physicians, and many freedmen in need of health care. Because of segregation, most hospitals would not admit African Americans and many white physicians often chose not to serve freedmen. During the late 19th century and into the early 20th century, most medical institutions accepted few, if any, African-American students.  To combat this shortage of health care and the lack of accessibility to medical education, individuals, such as Samuel Meharry, and organizations, such as the Medical Association of Colored Physicians, Surgeons, Dentists, and Pharmacists (later renamed the National Medical Association), helped to found medical schools specifically for African Americans.

The college was named for Samuel Meharry, a young Irish American immigrant who first worked as a salt trader on the Kentucky-Tennessee frontier. After achieving some success, he and four of his brothers later made a major donation to help establish the college. As a young trader, Meharry had been aided by a family of freedmen, whose names are unknown. Meharry reportedly told the former slave family, "I have no money, but when I can I shall do something for your race."

Students at Central Tennessee College (CTC) approached the college president about setting up a medical school in 1875. The president, John Braden, approached Samuel Meharry to discuss the proposal. In 1875, Meharry, together with four of his brothers, donated a total of $15,000 to assist with establishing a medical department at (CTC), a historically black college in Nashville, Tennessee.  With the contribution of the Freedman's Aid Society of the Methodist Episcopal Church North, George W. Hubbard and Braden, they opened the Medical College at CTC in 1876 with a starting class of nine students. The classes took place in the basement of the Clark Memorial Methodist Episcopal Church. The first regular year of classes began in October 1876 and had eleven students in that group. The medical program was initially two years long, but they added an additional year in 1879 and a fourth year to the course of study in 1893.

Hubbard, a physician, served as the founding president of the medical college. The first student graduated in 1877. The second class, which had its commencement in 1878, had three graduates.

In 1886, the Dental Department was founded, followed by a Pharmacy Department founded in 1889. The Dental and Pharmaceutical Building was dedicated on October 20, 1889. By 1896, half of all "regularly educated physicians then practicing in the South" had graduated from Meharry. A nurse-training school was also developed during the 1900–1901 school year and the first class had eight students. A training hospital, Mercy Hospital, was built during the 1901–1902 school year. This hospital was replaced in 1916 and named the George W. Hubbard Hospital. Meharry Auditorium, with a 1,000 person capacity was built in 1904.

In 1900, CTC changed its name to Walden University. In 1915, the medical department faculty of Walden University received a separate charter to operate independently as Meharry Medical College. The college continued to be privately funded. The Medical College remained in its original buildings, and Walden University moved to another campus in Nashville in 1922.

In 1910, Meharry absorbed medical students from Flint Medical College when that school was closed. Meharry also graduated a large number of women physicians for the time period, with 39 women having graduated by 1920. In 1923, Meharry was recognized as a "grade-A institution" by the American Medical Association (AMA).

Since its founding, Meharry Medical College has added several graduate programs in the areas of science, medicine, and public health. In 1938, the School of Graduate Studies and Research was founded. The first master's degree program, a Master of Science in Public Health, was established in 1947. In the 1950s, the nursing school and dental technology school were ended. The department of Psychiatry was established in 1961 by school president, Lloyd Charles Elam, a psychiatrist. During the 1960s, Meharry began to focus on fighting health disparities. In 1968, Meharry created the Matthew Walker Health Center to provide health services to the community. Also in 1968, the school added a Ph.D. degree in basic sciences.

By the late 1960s and early 1970s, 83 percent of all African American physicians had been trained at Meharry Medical College and Howard University School of Medicine. In 1970, more than 60 percent of black medical students worked as residents at these two colleges. In 1972, Meharry started receiving federal distress grants which were given to medical schools with deficits in operating costs and problems with accreditation. By 1976, the school campus took up space on 65 acres.

In 1981, the accrediting body of the AMA put Meharry on probation because there were not enough patients in the Hubbard Hospital for students and the student to teacher ratio was too high. In 1983, president Ronald Reagan allowed the school to work with patients in the nearby veterans' hospitals and the Blanchfield Army Community Hospital and the college regained full accreditation. By 1986, around 46 percent of all black faculty members in medical schools had graduated from Meharry.

In 1972, a Ph.D. program was implemented. A decade later in 1982, Meharry established an M.D/Ph.D. program. In 2004, Meharry created a Master's of Science in Clinical Investigation program (2004).

The Hubbard Hospital, belonging to Meharry Medical College, closed in 1994 and was renovated as the new site for the Metropolitan Nashville General Hospital, opening November 1997. The year 1994 was also a start for more renovations of campus buildings initiated by campus president, John E. Maupin Jr. The school was also suffering from a $49 million deficit and morale at the school was low. The Nashville General Hospital's lease money, however, helped bring money into the school and eventually, by June 1995, the finances of the school were stabilized. In 1999, the college partnered with Vanderbilt University Medical Center.

In 2005, Meharry was censured by the American Association of University Professors for not observing generally recognized principles of academic freedom and tenure.

On November 9, 2017, Meharry, under president James E.K. Hildreth, signed a memorandum of agreement with Hospital Corporation of America (HCA), America's largest for-profit operator of health care facilities. Under the agreement, Meharry's medical students will gain clinical training at HCA's TriStar Southern Hills Medical Center in Nashville. Meharry students had previously received clinical training at numerous sites, primarily Nashville General Hospital, which had moved on-campus in the 1990s. Withdrawal of the alliance with Meharry is thought to threaten the provision of inpatient care at Nashville General Hospital. A board member resigned over this surprise decision and announcement.

In September 2020, philanthropist Michael Bloomberg donated $34 million to help lower student debt at the institution.

In March 2022, MacKenzie Scott donated $20 million to Meharry.  Her gift is one of the largest in Meharry's history.

Presidents 
George W. Hubbard served as Meharry Medical College's first president from its founding in 1876 until his retirement in 1921.

The second president of the school was John J. Mullowney, who served from 1921 to 1938. He implemented changes in order to improve Meharry's overall academic rating. Admission requirements were tightened and strictly enforced, a superintendent was installed at the hospital, and the number of faculty, research facilities, and hospital facilities were all expanded. Two years after Mullowney took leadership, Meharry Medical College received an ‘A’ rating.

Succeeding Meharry Medical College presidents have been:
 Edward Lewis Turner (1938–1944),
 M. Don Clawson (1944–1950),
 Harold D. West (1952–1966),
 Lloyd C. Elam (1968–1981),
 Richard G. Lester (1981-1982),
 David Satcher (1982–1993),
 John E. Maupin (1994–2006),
 Wayne J. Riley (2006–2013), 
 A. Cherrie Epps (2013-2015), 
 James E.K. Hildreth (2015–present)

From 1950 to 1952 a committee guided the institution instead of a president. In 1952, Meharry welcomed its first African-American president, Dr. Harold D. West. West made numerous changes, made possible by his successful $20 million fund drive. He added a new wing to Hubbard Hospital, eliminated the nursing and the dental technology programs, and purchased land adjacent to the campus for expansion.

Research 
Meharry Medical College spent $96 million on research during fiscal years between 2013 and 2017. The school has a Graduate Studies and Research department.

Research centers include:
Asthma Disparities Center 
Center for Molecular and Behavioral Neurosciences
Center for Women's Health Research     
Clinical Research Center
Export Center for Health Disparities 
Meharry Center for Health Disparities Research in HIV 
Sickle Cell Center

BS/MD Program
Ten universities are in partnership with Meharry to better recruit and prepare their best pre-med students for the academic rigor of Meharry. The ten universities are Alabama A&M University, Albany State University, Alcorn State University, Fisk University, Grambling State University, Hampton University, Jackson State University, Southern University, Tennessee State University, and Virginia Union University.

Notable alumni

References

Sources

Additional references
 
  .
 Summerville, James. Educating Black Doctors; A History of Meharry Medical College. Tuscaloosa: The University of Alabama Press, 1983.

External links

Official website

 
Universities and colleges in Nashville, Tennessee
Private universities and colleges in Tennessee
Historically black universities and colleges in the United States
Medical schools in Tennessee
Universities and colleges accredited by the Southern Association of Colleges and Schools
Historically black hospitals in the United States
African-American history in Nashville, Tennessee
Universities and colleges affiliated with the Methodist Episcopal Church